Kim So-eun (born September 6, 1989) is a South Korean actress. She rose to fame in 2009 in the popular television drama Boys Over Flowers. She has since starred in Happiness in the Wind (2010), A Thousand Kisses (2011–12), Liar Game (2014), Scholar Who Walks the Night (2015), Our Gap-soon (2016–17), and Evergreen (2018).

Acting career

2004–2009: First films and rising popularity
Kim So-eun made her acting debut with a bit part in the 2004 film Two Guys, when she was in junior high school. She then appeared in minor roles on TV and film, including Sisters of the Sea and The Show Must Go On (where she played Song Kang-ho's daughter).

Kim rose to fame in 2009 with her supporting role as the heroine's best friend in the hit drama Boys Over Flowers. The same year, Kim gained praise for her versatility since for her portrayal of Chae Shi-ra's childhood counterpart Hwangbo Soo in the period epic Empress Cheonchu, for which she learned how to ride a horse and shoot with a bow and arrow. Kim then portrayed an older mid 20s woman in the romantic comedy series He Who Can't Marry, a remake of Japanese drama Kekkon Dekinai Otoko.

2010–2012: Transition leading roles
Kim landed her first leading role in the 2010 daily drama Happiness in the Wind (also known as Happiness in the Wind), which further raised her Korean Wave profile. She then starred in weekend drama A Thousand Kisses (2011-2012), which explored age differences in relationships.

In 2012, she starred in the ten-episode Chinese drama Secret Angel (Chinese: 秘密天使), which aired on the portal website Sohu.com. She returned to Korean television in the cable drama Happy Ending. That same year, she also appeared in Music and Lyrics, a reality show in which an actress and a male musician are paired together to collaborate, as lyricist and composer respectively, in creating a song. Kim and Lee Junho (from boyband 2PM) composed the song "Love is Sad," which Lee also recorded; it was released as a single and featured on the soundtrack of Feast of the Gods.

After playing Princess Sukhwi in the period epic Horse Doctor (also known as The King's Doctor, 2012–2013), Kim starred in After School: Lucky or Not (in the Korean title, bokbulbok refers to a game of chance, literally meaning "Luck, No Luck"), opposite the 5 members of actor-idol group 5urprise, which was distributed via SK Telecom's online and mobile portals.

She and Victoria Song (member of girl group f(x)) were also chosen to host Glitter, a variety show on the lives of trendy twenty-somethings.

2014–present: Return to screen television
In 2014, Kim starred in the horror film Mourning Grave, playing a ghost girl who forms a friendship with a ghost-seeing high school boy Kang Ha-neul. This was followed by a leading role in Liar Game, a Korean drama adaptation of the titular Japanese manga by Shinobu Kaitani. Kim also joined the fourth season of reality show We Got Married, where she was paired with Song Jae-rim in a "virtual" marriage; it boosted their popularity as a couple and as individual celebrities.

In 2015, Kim starred in the webtoon adaptation Scholar Who Walks the Night, playing dual roles as a nobleman's daughter and a vampire's past love. She was set to launch her activities in China through the romance film Sky Lantern (also known as Lover of Days Past), a Korean-Chinese co-production film in which she stars opposite Taiwanese singer-actor Aaron Yan. The same year, she starred in the web drama Falling for Challenge alongside Xiumin.

In 2016, Kim signed with new management agency Will Entertainment. From 2016 to 2017, she starred in the family drama Our Gap-soon as the title character.

In 2017, Kim starred in the KBS Drama Special You're Closer than I Think together with actor Lee Sang-yeob. The same year, Kim confirmed her return to the silver screen with romance fantasy film Are you in love? opposite Sung Hoon.

In 2018, Kim starred in the romance comedy series That Man Oh Soo with CNBLUE's Lee Jong-hyun.

In August 2021, Kim signed with new agency Ascendio Reserve.

Other activities
As a child, Kim trained professionally as a national athletic skier. Her training was put on indefinite hold after being scouted as a professional model in a 2003 junior advanced skiing and snowboarding competition in Pyeongchang, Gangwon-do. She retained her interest in the sport, appearing in 2012 instructional videos for Hongcheon's Vivaldi ski resort.

Kim has endorsed various products, and has appeared in magazines. such as Allure Korea, High Cut, Vogue Korea, InStyle Korea, Elle Girl Korea, Harper's Bazaar, CeCi, L'Officiel, Esquire Korea, and Nylon Korea.

A regular advocate of art films, youth activism, and eco-living, she served as the goodwill ambassador for the 2009 Korea International Youth Film Festival, the 2009 University Fashion Week, the 2011 Jeonju International Film Festival, the Golden Cinema Festival in 2013 and 2014, and the 2014 Green Film Festival.

Filmography

Film

Television series

Web-drama

Television show

Music video

Awards and nominations

References

External links

 Kim So-eun fan cafe at Daum 

Living people
People from Namyangju
1989 births
South Korean child actresses
South Korean television actresses
South Korean film actresses
South Korean web series actresses